General Alfred Candidus Ferdinand, Prince of Windisch-Grätz (11 May 178721 March 1862), a member of the Bohemian noble Windisch-Graetz family, was a Field Marshal in the Austrian army. He is most noted for his service during the Napoleonic Wars and for his role in suppressing the Revolutions of 1848 in the Austrian Empire.

Background
Originally from Styria, the Windisch-Graetz dynasty had received Inkolat rights of nobility by the Bohemian Crown in 1574. Alfred was born in Brussels, then capital of the Austrian Netherlands, the son of Count Joseph Nicholas of Windisch-Graetz (1744–1802) and his second wife, Duchess Maria Leopoldine Franziska of Arenberg. With the help of his mother's rich dowry, the family took its residence at Tachau (Tachov), the lordship having been purchased by Alfred's father in 1781.

On 15 June 1817 he married Princess Eleonore of Schwarzenberg, daughter of Prince Josef Johann of Schwarzenberg.

Napoleon
He started service in the Habsburg imperial army in 1804. As an Austrian army officer he distinguished himself throughout the wars fought by the Habsburg Monarchy in the 19th century.

Windisch-Grätz participated in all the wars against Napoleon and fought with distinction at the Battle of Leipzig and in the campaign of 1814. In 1833, he was named Lieutenant Field Marshal (made Field Marshal in October 1848).

Bohemia
In the years of peace that followed, Windisch-Grätz held commands in Prague, being appointed head of the army in Bohemia in 1840. Having gained a reputation as a champion of energetic measures against revolution, during the Revolutions of 1848 in Habsburg areas he was called upon to suppress the March 1848 insurrection in Vienna. However, finding himself ill-supported by government ministers he resigned from his post.

After returning to Prague, his wife was killed by a stray bullet during the popular uprising.  He then showed firmness in quelling an armed outbreak of the Czech separatists (June 1848), declaring martial law throughout Bohemia. Upon the recrudescence of revolt in Vienna he was summoned to head a large army that reduced the city through a formal siege by October 1848.

Hungary

Appointed to the chief command against the Hungarian revolutionaries under Lajos Kossuth, he gained some early successes and reoccupied Buda and Pest (January 1849), but by his slowness in pursuit he allowed the enemy to rally in superior numbers and to prevent an effective concentration of the Austrian forces.

In April 1849 he was relieved of his command and thereafter rarely appeared again in public life.

Quotes
(In reference to rebellious constitutionalists) "They do not want to hear about the Grace of God? They will hear the grace of the cannon."

Honours
He received the following orders and decorations:

Ancestry

References

Bibliography
 Fürst Windischgrätz. Eine Lebensskizze. Aus den Papieren eines Zeitgenossen der Sturm-Jahre 1848 und 1849 (2nd ed., Leipzig, 1898)
 Nobili, Johann. Hungary 1848: The Winter Campaign. Edited and translated Christopher Pringle. Warwick, UK: Helion & Company Ltd., 2021.

1787 births
1862 deaths
Nobility from Brussels
Windisch-Graetz
Windisch-Gratz
Windisch-Gratz
Windisch-Gratz
Austrian Empire military personnel of the Napoleonic Wars
Windisch-Gratz
Windisch-Gratz
Windisch-Gratz
Windisch-Gratz
Windisch-Gratz
Grand Crosses of the Order of Saint Stephen of Hungary
Knights of Malta
Recipients of the Order of St. George of the Fourth Degree
Recipients of the Order of St. Vladimir, 3rd class
Knights Grand Cross of the Order of Saints Maurice and Lazarus
Knights Grand Cross of the Order of St Gregory the Great